Butcher Creek is a stream in the U.S. state of South Dakota.

Some say the creek has the name of Charles "Butch" Benard, an early settler, while others believe it has the name of William "Butch" Butcher, a cook at a local ranch.

See also
List of rivers of South Dakota

References

Rivers of Perkins County, South Dakota
Rivers of South Dakota